Brother/Sister is the debut album by the band Hymns. It was released by Rock Ridge Music on October 10, 2006, and regarded as "infectious" by John Norris of MTV News.

Track listing 
 Magazines - 3:21
 Brother/Sister - 2:57
 Friends of Mine - 4:08
 C'mon, C'mon - 3:59
 Power in the Street - 3:06
 Scenery Glow - 4:04
 First Time - 3:35
 Stop Talking - 3:35
 It's a Shame - 3:48
 Starboat - 5:27
 Town - 4:44

References

1. Norris, John. "Hymns Deliver Southern-Fried LP." MTV News Blog. January 22, 2008.

External links 
 Hymns official Website

2006 albums